The Amish, formally the Old Order Amish, are a group of traditionalist Anabaptist Christian church fellowships with Swiss German and Alsatian (French) origins. They are closely related to Mennonite churches, another Anabaptist denomination. The Amish are known for simple living, plain dress, Christian pacifism, and slowness to adopt many conveniences of modern technology, with a view neither to interrupt family time, nor replace face-to-face conversations whenever possible, and a view to maintain self-sufficiency. The Amish value rural life, manual labor, humility and Gelassenheit (submission to God's will).

The Amish church began with a schism in Switzerland within a group of Swiss and Alsatian Mennonite Anabaptists in 1693 led by Jakob Ammann. Those who followed Ammann became known as Amish. In the second half of the 19th century, the Amish divided into Old Order Amish and Amish Mennonites; the latter do not abstain from using motor cars, whereas the Old Order Amish retained much of their traditional culture. When people refer to the Amish today, they normally refer to the Old Order Amish, though there are other subgroups of Amish. In the early 18th century, many Amish and Mennonites immigrated to Pennsylvania for a variety of reasons. Today, the Old Order Amish, the New Order Amish, and the Old Beachy Amish as well as Old Order Mennonites continue to speak Pennsylvania Dutch, although two different Alemannic dialects are used by Old Order Amish in Adams and Allen counties in Indiana. , over 350,000 Old Order Amish lived in the United States, and about 6,000 lived in Canada: a population that is rapidly growing, as the Amish generally do not use birth control. Amish church groups seek to maintain a degree of separation from the non-Amish world. Non-Amish people are generally referred to as "English" by the Amish, and outside influences are often described as "worldly".

Amish church membership begins with adult baptism, usually between the ages of 16 and 23. Church districts have between 20 and 40 families, and worship services are held every other Sunday in a member's home or barn. The rules of the church, the Ordnung, which differs to some extent between different districts, are reviewed twice a year by all members of the church. The Ordnung must be observed by every member and covers many aspects of day-to-day living, including prohibitions or limitations on the use of power-line electricity, telephones, and automobiles, as well as regulations on clothing. Generally, a heavy emphasis is placed on church and family relationships. The Amish typically operate their own one-room schools and discontinue formal education after grade eight. Most Amish do not buy commercial insurance or participate in Social Security. As present-day Anabaptists, Amish church members practice nonresistance and will not perform any type of military service.

History

Beginnings of Anabaptist Christianity

The Anabaptist movement, from which the Amish later emerged, started in circles around Huldrych Zwingli (1484–1531) who led the early Reformation in Switzerland. In Zürich on January 21, 1525, Conrad Grebel and George Blaurock practiced believer's baptism to each other and then to others. This Swiss movement, part of the Radical Reformation, later became known as Swiss Brethren.

Emergence of the Amish 
The s were a more extreme congregation; their zeal pushed them into more remote areas.

Swiss Anabaptism developed, from this point, in two parallel streams, most clearly marked by disagreement over the preferred treatment of "fallen" believers. The Emmentalers (sometimes referred to as Reistians, after bishop Hans Reist, a leader among the Emmentalers) argued that fallen believers should only be withheld from communion, and not regular meals.  The Amish argued that those who had been banned should be avoided even in common meals.  The Reistian side eventually formed the basis of the Swiss Mennonite Conference. Because of this common heritage, Amish and conservative Mennonites from southern Germany and Switzerland retain many similarities. Those who leave the Amish fold tend to join various congregations of Conservative Mennonites.

Migration to North America 
Amish began migrating to Pennsylvania, then-regarded favorably due to the lack of religious persecution and attractive land offers, in the early 18th century as part of a larger migration from the Palatinate and neighboring areas. Between 1717 and 1750, approximately 500 Amish migrated to North America, mainly to the region that became Berks County, Pennsylvania, but later moved, motivated by land issues and by security concerns tied to the French and Indian War. Many eventually settled in Lancaster County. A second wave of around 1,500 arrived around the mid 19th century and settled mostly in Ohio, Illinois, Iowa and southern Ontario. Most of these late immigrants eventually did not join the Old Order Amish but more liberal groups.

1850–1878 Division into Old Orders and Amish Mennonites

Most Amish communities that were established in North America did not ultimately retain their Amish identity. The major division that resulted in the loss of identity of many Amish congregations occurred in the third quarter of the 19th century. The forming of factions worked its way out at different times at different places. The process was rather a "sorting out" than a split. Amish people are free to join another Amish congregation at another place that fits them best.

In the years after 1850, tensions rose within individual Amish congregations and between different Amish congregations. Between 1862 and 1878, yearly  (ministerial conferences) were held at different places, concerning how the Amish should deal with the tensions caused by the pressures of modern society. The meetings themselves were a progressive idea; for bishops to assemble to discuss uniformity was an unprecedented notion in the Amish church. By the first several meetings, the more traditionally minded bishops agreed to boycott the conferences.

The more progressive members, comprising roughly two-thirds of the group, became known by the name Amish Mennonite, and eventually united with the Mennonite Church, and other Mennonite denominations, mostly in the early 20th century. The more traditionally minded groups became known as the Old Order Amish. The Egli Amish had already started to withdraw from the Amish church in 1858. They soon drifted away from the old ways and changed their name to "Defenseless Mennonite" in 1908. Congregations who took no side in the division after 1862 formed the Conservative Amish Mennonite Conference in 1910, but dropped the word "Amish" from their name in 1957; in 2000 many congregations left to organize the Biblical Mennonite Alliance in order to continue the practice of traditional Anabaptist ordinances, such as headcovering.

Because no division occurred in Europe, the Amish congregations remaining there took the same way as the change-minded Amish Mennonites in North America and slowly merged with the Mennonites. The last Amish congregation in Germany to merge was the Ixheim Amish congregation, which merged with the neighboring Mennonite Church in 1937. Some Mennonite congregations, including most in Alsace, are descended directly from former Amish congregations.

20th century 
Though splits happened among the Old Order in the 19th century in Mifflin County, Pennsylvania, a major split among the Old Orders took until World War I. At that time, two very conservative affiliations emerged – the Swartzentruber Amish in Holmes County, Ohio, and the Buchanan Amish in Iowa. The Buchanan Amish soon were joined by like-minded congregations all over the country.

With World War I came the massive suppression of the German language in the US that eventually led to language shift of most Pennsylvania German speakers, leaving the Amish and other Old Orders as almost the only speakers by the end of the 20th century. This created a language barrier around the Amish that did not exist before in that form.

In the late 1920s, the more change minded faction of the Old Order Amish, that wanted to adopt the car, broke away from the mainstream and organized under the name Beachy Amish.

During the Second World War, the old question of military service for the Amish came up again. Because Amish young men in general refused military service, they ended up in the Civilian Public Service (CPS), where they worked mainly in forestry and hospitals. The fact that many young men worked in hospitals, where they had a lot of contact with more progressive Mennonites and the outside world, had the result that many of these men never joined the Amish church.

In the 1950s, the Beachy Amish, as with the New Order Amish, laid heavy emphasis on the New Birth, personal holiness and Sunday School education. The ones who wanted to preserve the old way of the Beachy became the Old Beachy Amish.

Until about 1950, almost all Amish children attended small, local, non-Amish schools, but then school consolidation and mandatory schooling beyond eighth grade caused Amish opposition. Amish communities opened their own Amish schools. In 1972, the United States Supreme Court exempted Amish pupils from compulsory education past eighth grade. By the end of the 20th century, almost all Amish children attended Amish schools.

In the last quarter of the 20th century, a growing number of Amish men left farm work and started small businesses because of increasing pressure on small-scale farming. Though a wide variety of small businesses exists among the Amish, construction work and woodworking are quite widespread. In many Amish settlements, especially the larger ones, farmers are now a minority. Approximately 12,000 of the 40,000 dairy farms in the United States are Amish-owned as of 2018.

Until the early 20th century, Old Order Amish identity was not linked to the use of technologies, as the Old Order Amish and their rural neighbors used the same farm and household technologies. Questions about the use of technologies also did not play a role in the Old Order division of the second half of the 19th century. Telephones were the first important technology that was rejected, soon followed by the rejection of cars, tractors, radios, and many other technological inventions of the 20th century.

Old Order Mennonites and Amish sects are often grouped together in North America's popular press. This is incorrect, according to a 2017 report by Canadian Mennonite magazine:

Religious practices

The Amish's willingness to submit to the "Will of Jesus", expressed through group norms, is at odds with the individualism so central to the wider American culture. The Amish anti-individualist orientation is the motive for rejecting labor-saving technologies that might make one less dependent on the community. Modern innovations such as electricity might spark a competition for status goods, or photographs might cultivate personal vanity. Electric power lines would be going against the Bible, which says that you shall not be "conformed to the world".

Amish church membership begins with baptism, usually between the ages of 16 and 23. It is a requirement for marriage within the Amish church. Once a person is baptized within the church, he or she may marry only within the faith. Church districts have between 20 and 40 families and worship services are held every other Sunday in a member's home or barn. The district is led by a bishop and several ministers and deacons who are chosen by a combination of election and cleromancy (lot).

The rules of the church, the so-called Ordnung, which differs to some extent between different districts, is reviewed twice a year by all members of the church. Only if all members give their consent to it, Lord's supper is held. The Ordnung must be observed by every member and covers many aspects of day-to-day living, including prohibitions or limitations on the use of power-line electricity, telephones, and automobiles, as well as regulations on clothing.  As present-day Anabaptists, Amish church members practice nonresistance and will not perform any type of military service. The Amish value rural life, manual labor, humility, and Gelassenheit, all under the auspices of living what they interpret to be God's word.

Members who do not conform to these community expectations and who cannot be convinced to repent are excommunicated. In addition to excommunication, members may be shunned, a practice that limits social contacts to shame the wayward member into returning to the church. Almost 90 percent of Amish teenagers choose to be baptized and join the church. During an adolescent period of rumspringa (dialectal [Pennsylvania] German for "jumping around", "hopping around") in some communities, nonconforming behavior that would result in the shunning of an adult who had made the permanent commitment of baptism, may be met with a degree of forbearance.

Way of life

What is acceptable in one community may not be acceptable in another. The  is agreed upon – or changed – within the whole community of baptized members prior to Communion which takes place two times a year. The  include matters such as dress, permissible uses of technology, religious duties, and rules regarding interaction with outsiders.

Bearing children, raising them, and socializing with neighbors and relatives are the greatest functions of the Amish family. Amish typically believe that large families are a blessing from God. Farm families tend to have larger families, because sons are needed to perform farm labor. Community is central to the Amish way of life.

Working hard is considered godly, and some technological advancements have been considered undesirable because they reduce the need for hard work. Machines such as automatic floor cleaners in barns have historically been rejected as this provides young farmhands with too much free time.

Clothing

The Amish are known for their plain attire. Men wear solid colored shirts, broad-brimmed hats, and suits that signify similarity amongst one another. Amish men grow beards to symbolize manhood and marital status, as well as to promote humility. They are forbidden to grow mustaches because mustaches are seen by the Amish as being affiliated with the military, which they are strongly opposed to, due to their pacifist beliefs. They are to wear calf-length dresses, muted colors along with bonnets and aprons. Prayer kapps and bonnets are worn by the women because they are a visual representation of their religious beliefs and promote unity through the tradition of every woman wearing one. The color of the bonnet signifies whether a woman is single or married. Single women wear black bonnets and married women wear white. The color coding of bonnets is important because women are not allowed to wear jewelry, such as wedding rings, as it is seen as drawing attention to the body which can induce pride in the individual. All clothing is sewn by hand, but the way to fasten the garment widely depends on whether the Amish person is a part of the New Order or Old Order Amish. The Old Order Amish seldom, if ever, use buttons because they are seen as too flashy; instead, they use the hook and eye approach to fashion clothing or metal snaps. The New Order Amish are slightly more progressive and allow the usage of buttons to help attire clothing.

Cuisine
Amish cuisine is noted for its simplicity and traditional qualities. Food plays an important part in Amish social life and is served at potlucks, weddings, fundraisers, farewells, and other events. Many Amish foods are sold at markets including pies, preserves, bread mixes, pickled produce, desserts, and canned goods. Many Amish communities have also established restaurants for visitors. Amish meat consumption is similar to the American average though they tend to eat more preserved meat.

Amish cuisine is often mistaken for the similar cuisine of the Pennsylvania Dutch with some ethnographic and regional variances, as well as differences in what cookbook writers and food historians emphasize about the traditional foodways and intertwined religious culture and celebrations of Amish communities. While mythologies about the diffusion of shoofly pie are common subject matter for studies of American cuisine, food anthropologists point out that the culinary practices of Pennsylvania Dutch and Amish are innovative and dynamic, evolving across time and geographical spaces, and that not all the Pennsylvania Dutch are Amish, and not all Amish live in Pennsylvania. Distinguishing local mythologies from culinary fact is accomplished by dedicated anthropological field studies in combination with studies of literary sources, usually newspaper archives, diaries and household records.

Subgroups

Over the years, the Amish churches have divided many times mostly over questions concerning the Ordnung, but also over doctrinal disputes, mainly about shunning. The largest group, the "Old Order" Amish, a conservative faction that separated from other Amish in the 1860s, are those who have most emphasized traditional practices and beliefs. The New Order Amish are a group of Amish whom some scholars see best described as a subgroup of Old Order Amish, despite the name.

Affiliations
As of 2011, about 40 different Old Order Amish affiliations were known to exist.  The eight major affiliations are listed below, with Lancaster as the largest one in number of districts and population:

Use of technology by different affiliations
The table below indicates the use of certain technologies by different Amish affiliations. The use of cars is not allowed by any Old and New Order Amish, nor are radio, television, or in most cases the use of the Internet. Three affiliations — "Lancaster", "Holmes Old Order" and "Elkhart-LaGrange" — are not only the three largest affiliations but also represent the mainstream among the Old Order Amish. The most conservative affiliations are at the top, the most modern ones at the bottom. Technologies used by very few are on the left; the ones used by most are on the right. The percentage of all Amish who use a technology is also indicated approximately. The Old Order Amish culture involves lower greenhouse gas emissions in all sectors and activities with the exception of diet, and their per-person emissions has been estimated to be less than one quarter that of the wider society.<ref></ref>

Language

Most Old Order Amish speak Pennsylvania Dutch, and refer to non-Amish people as "English", regardless of ethnicity. Two Amish subgroups – called Swiss Amish – whose ancestors migrated to the United States in the 1850s speak a form of Bernese German (Adams County, IN and daughter setllements) or a Low Alemannic Alsatian dialect (Allen County, IN and daughter setllements).

Contrary to popular belief, the word "Dutch" in "Pennsylvania Dutch" is not a mistranslation, but rather a corruption of the Pennsylvania German endonym , which means "Pennsylvania Dutch / German" or "German".Mark L. Louden: Pennsylvania Dutch: The Story of an American Language. JHU Press, 2006, p.2Irwin Richman: The Pennsylvania Dutch Country. Arcadia Publishing, 2004, p.16. Ultimately, the terms Deitsch, Dutch, Diets and Deutsch are all cognates and descend from the Proto-Germanic word  meaning "popular" or "of the people".

According to one scholar, "today, almost all Amish are functionally bilingual in Pennsylvania Dutch and English; however, domains of usage are sharply separated. Pennsylvania Dutch dominates in most in-group settings, such as the dinner table and preaching in church services. In contrast, English is used for most reading and writing. English is also the medium of instruction in schools and is used in business transactions and often, out of politeness, in situations involving interactions with non-Amish. Finally, the Amish read prayers and sing in Standard German (which, in Pennsylvania Dutch, is called ) at church services. The distinctive use of three different languages serves as a powerful conveyor of Amish identity. "Although 'the English language is being used in more and more situations,' Pennsylvania Dutch is 'one of a handful of minority languages in the United States that is neither endangered nor supported by continual arrivals of immigrants.'"

Ethnicity
The Amish largely share a German or Swiss-German ancestry. They generally use the term "Amish" only for members of their faith community and not as an ethnic designation. However some Amish descendants recognize their cultural background knowing that their genetic and cultural traits are uniquely different from other ethnicities. Those who choose to affiliate with the church, or young children raised in Amish homes, but too young to yet be church members, are considered to be Amish. Certain Mennonite churches have a high number of people who were formerly from Amish congregations. Although more Amish immigrated to North America in the 19th century than during the 18th century, most of today's Amish descend from 18th-century immigrants. The latter tended to emphasize tradition to a greater extent, and were perhaps more likely to maintain a separate Amish identity.  There are a number of Amish Mennonite church groups that had never in their history been associated with the Old Order Amish because they split from the Amish mainstream in the time when the Old Orders formed in the 1860s and 1870s. The former Western Ontario Mennonite Conference (WOMC) was made up almost entirely of former Amish Mennonites who reunited with the Mennonite Church in Canada. Orland Gingerich's book The Amish of Canada devotes the vast majority of its pages not to the Beachy or Old Order Amish, but to congregations in the former WOMC.

Para-Amish groups
Several other groups, called "para-Amish" by G. C. Waldrep and others, share many characteristics with the Amish, such as horse and buggy transportation, plain dress, and the preservation of the German language. The members of these groups are largely of Amish origin, but they are not in fellowship with other Amish groups because they adhere to theological doctrines (e.g., assurance of salvation) or practices (community of goods) that are normally not accepted among mainstream Amish. The Bergholz Community is a different case, it is not seen as Amish anymore because the community has shifted away from many core Amish principles.

Population and distribution

Because the Amish are usually baptized no earlier than 18 and children are not counted in local congregation numbers, estimating their numbers is difficult. Rough estimates from various studies placed their numbers at 125,000 in 1992, 166,000 in 2000, and 221,000 in 2008. Thus, from 1992 to 2008, population growth among the Amish in North America was 84 percent (3.6 percent per year). During that time, they established 184 new settlements and moved into six new states. In 2000, about 165,620 Old Order Amish resided in the United States, of whom 73,609 were church members.  The Amish are among the fastest-growing populations in the world, with an average of seven children per family in the 1970s and a total fertility rate of 5.3 in the 2010s.

In 2010, a few religious bodies, including the Amish, changed the way their adherents were reported to better match the standards of the Association of Statisticians of American Religious Bodies. When looking at all Amish adherents and not solely Old Order Amish, about 241,000 Amish adherents were in 28 U.S. states in 2010.

Distribution by country
United States

The United States is the home to the overwhelming majority (98 percent) of the Amish people. In 2022, Old Order communities were present in 32 U.S. states. The total Amish population in the United States  has stood at 367,300 up 11,635 or 3.3 percent, compared to the previous year. Pennsylvania has the largest population (87 thousand), followed by Ohio (81.7 thousand) and Indiana (62.8 thousand), . The largest Amish settlements are in Lancaster County in southeastern Pennsylvania (40,525), Holmes County and adjacent counties in northeastern Ohio (36,955), and Elkhart and LaGrange counties in northeastern Indiana (26,380), . The highest concentration of Amish in the world is in the Holmes County community; nearly 50 percent of the entire population of Holmes County is Amish as of 2010.

The largest concentration of Amish west of the Mississippi River is in Missouri, with other settlements in eastern Iowa and southeast Minnesota. The largest Amish settlements in Iowa are located near Kalona and Bloomfield. The largest settlement in Wisconsin is near Cashton with 13 congregations, i.e. about 2,000 people in 2009.

Because of the rapid population growth of the Amish communities, new settlements in the United States are being established each year, thus: 17 new settlements were established in 2016, 24 in 2017, 19 in 2018, 27 in 2019, 26 in 2020 and 18 in 2021. The main reason for the continuous expansion is to obtain enough affordable farmland, other reasons for new settlements include locating in isolated areas that support their lifestyle, moving to areas with cultures conducive to their way of life, maintaining proximity to family or other Amish groups, and sometimes to resolve church or leadership conflicts.

The adjacent table shows the eight states with the largest Amish population in the years 1992, 2000, 2010, 2020, 2021 and 2022.

Canada

Amish settlements are in four Canadian provinces: Ontario, Prince Edward Island, Manitoba, and New Brunswick. The majority of Old Order settlements is located in the province of Ontario, namely Oxford (Norwich Township) and Norfolk Counties. A small community is also established in Bruce County (Huron-Kinloss Township) near Lucknow.

In 2016, several dozen Old Order Amish families founded two new settlements in Kings County in the province of Prince Edward Island. Increasing land prices in Ontario had reportedly limited the ability of members in those communities to purchase new farms. At about the same time a new settlement was founded near Perth-Andover in New Brunswick, only about 12 km from Amish settlements in Maine. In 2017, an Amish settlement was founded in Manitoba near Stuartburn.

Latin America

There are currently two Amish settlements in South American nations: Argentina and Bolivia. The majority of Old Order settlements are located in Bolivia. The first attempt by Old Order Amish to settle in Latin America was in Paradise Valley, near Galeana, Nuevo León, Mexico, but the settlement lasted from only 1923 to 1929. An Amish settlement was tried in Honduras from about 1968 to 1978, but this settlement failed too. Most of the members of these new communities come from Old Colony Mennonite background and have been living in the area for several decades.

Europe
In Europe, no split occurred between Old Order Amish and Amish Mennonites; like the Amish Mennonites in North America, the European Amish assimilated into the Mennonite mainstream during the second half of the 19th century through the first decades of the 20th century. Eventually, they dropped the word "Amish" from the names of their congregations and lost their Amish identity and culture. The last European Amish congregation joined the Mennonites in 1937 in Ixheim, today part of Zweibrücken in the Palatinate region.

Seekers and joiners

Only a few hundred outsiders, so-called seekers, have ever joined the Old Order Amish. Since 1950, only some 75 non-Anabaptist people have joined and remained lifelong members of the Amish. Since 1990, some twenty people of Russian Mennonite background have joined the Amish in Aylmer, Ontario.

Two whole Christian communities have joined the Amish: The church at Smyrna, Maine, one of the five Christian Communities of Elmo Stoll after Stoll's death and the church at Manton, Michigan, which belonged to a community that was founded by Harry Wanner (1935–2012), a minister of Stauffer Old Order Mennonite background. The "Michigan Amish Churches", with which Smyrna and Manton affiliated, are said to be more open to seekers and converts than other Amish churches. Most of the members of these two para-Amish communities originally came from Plain churches, i.e. Old Order Amish, Old Order Mennonite, or Old German Baptist Brethren.

More people have tested Old Order Amish life for weeks, months, or even years, but in the end decided not to join. Others remain close to the Amish, but never think of joining.

On the other hand, the Beachy Amish, many of whom conduct their services in English and allow for a limited range of modern conveniences, regularly receive seekers into their churches as visitors, and eventually, as members.

Stephen Scott, himself a convert to the Old Order River Brethren, distinguishes four types of seekers:
 Checklist seekers are looking for a few certain specifications.
 Cultural seekers are more enchanted with the lifestyle of the Amish than with their religion.
 Spiritual utopian seekers are looking for true New Testament Christianity.
 Stability seekers come with emotional issues, often from dysfunctional families.

Health

Amish populations have higher incidences of particular conditions, including dwarfism, Angelman syndrome, and various metabolic disorders, as well as an unusual distribution of blood types. The Amish represent a collection of different demes or genetically closed communities. Although the Amish do not have higher incidence of genetic disorders than the general population, since almost all Amish descend from a few hundred 18th-century founders, some recessive conditions are more prevalent (an example of the founder effect). Some of these disorders are rare or unique, and are serious enough to increase the mortality rate among Amish children. The Amish are aware of the advantages of exogamy, but for religious reasons, marry only within their communities. When a child is born with a disorder, it is accepted into the community and tasked with chores within their ability. However, Amish are willing to participate in studies of genetic diseases. Their extensive family histories are useful to researchers investigating diseases such as Alzheimer's, Parkinson's, and macular degeneration.

While the Amish are at an increased risk for some genetic disorders, researchers have found their tendency for clean living can lead to better health. Overall cancer rates in the Amish are reduced and tobacco-related cancers in Amish adults are 37 percent and non-tobacco-related cancers are 72 percent of the rate for Ohio adults. Skin cancer rates are lower for Amish, even though many Amish make their living working outdoors where they are exposed to sunlight. They are typically covered and dressed by wearing wide-brimmed hats and long sleeves which protect their skin.

Treating genetic problems is the mission of Clinic for Special Children in Strasburg, Pennsylvania, which has developed effective treatments for such problems as maple syrup urine disease, a previously fatal disease. The clinic is embraced by most Amish, ending the need for parents to leave the community to receive proper care for their children, an action that might result in shunning. Another clinic is DDC Clinic for Special Needs Children, located in Middlefield, Ohio, for special-needs children with inherited or metabolic disorders. The DDC Clinic provides treatment, research, and educational services to Amish and non-Amish children and their families.

People's Helpers is an Amish-organized network of mental health caregivers who help families dealing with mental illness and recommend professional counselors.  Suicide rates for the Amish are about half that of the general population.

The Old Order Amish do not typically carry private commercial health insurance. A handful of American hospitals, starting in the mid-1990s, created special outreach programs to assist the Amish. In some Amish communities, the church will collect money from its members to help pay for medical bills of other members. Although the Amish are often perceived by outsiders as rejecting all modern technologies, this is not the case and modern medicine is employed by Amish communities, including hospital births and other advanced treatments. As they go without health insurance and pay up front for services, Amish individuals will often travel to Mexico for non-urgent care and surgery to reduce costs.

Although not forbidden, most Amish do not practice any form of birth control. They are against abortion and also find "artificial insemination, genetics, eugenics, and stem cell research" to be "inconsistent with Amish values and beliefs". However, some communities allow access to birth control to women whose health would be compromised by childbirth.

Life in the modern world

As time has passed, the Amish have felt pressures from the modern world. Issues such as taxation, education, law and its enforcement, and occasional discrimination and hostility are areas of difficulty.

The modern way of life in general has increasingly diverged from that of Amish society. On occasion, this has resulted in sporadic discrimination and hostility from their neighbors, such as throwing of stones or other objects at Amish horse-drawn carriages on the roads.

The Amish do not usually educate their children past the eighth grade, believing that the basic knowledge offered up to that point is sufficient to prepare one for the Amish lifestyle. Almost no Amish go to high school and college. In many communities, the Amish operate their own schools, which are typically one-room schoolhouses with teachers (usually young, unmarried women) from the Amish community. On May 19, 1972, Jonas Yoder and Wallace Miller of the Old Order Amish, and Adin Yutzy of the Conservative Amish Mennonite Church were each fined $5 for refusing to send their children, aged 14 and 15, to high school. In Wisconsin v. Yoder (1972), the Wisconsin Supreme Court overturned the conviction, and the U.S. Supreme Court affirmed this, finding the benefits of universal education were not sufficient justification to overcome scrutiny under the Free Exercise Clause of the First Amendment.

The Amish are subject to sales and property taxes.  As they seldom own motor vehicles, they rarely have occasion to pay motor vehicle registration fees or spend money on the purchase of fuel for vehicles. Under their beliefs and traditions, generally the Amish do not agree with the idea of Social Security benefits and have a religious objection to insurance. On this basis, the United States Internal Revenue Service agreed in 1961 that they did not need to pay Social Security-related taxes.  In 1965, this policy was codified into law. Self-employed individuals in certain sects do not pay into or receive benefits from the United States Social Security system. This exemption applies to a religious group that is conscientiously opposed to accepting benefits of any private or public insurance, provides a reasonable level of living for its dependent members, and has existed continuously since December 31, 1950. The U.S. Supreme Court clarified in 1982 that Amish employers are not exempt, but only those Amish individuals who are self-employed.

Publishing
In 1964, Pathway Publishers was founded by two Amish farmers to print more material about the Amish and Anabaptists in general. It is located in Lagrange, Indiana, and Aylmer, Ontario. Pathway has become the major publisher of Amish school textbooks, general-reading books, and periodicals. Also, a number of private enterprises publish everything from general reading to reprints of older literature that has been considered of great value to Amish families. Some Amish read the Pennsylvania German newspaper , and some of them even contribute dialect texts.

 Dog breeding 
Amish and Mennonite communities across many states have turned to dog breeding as a lucrative source of income. According to the USDA list of licensees, over 98% of Ohio's puppy mills are run by the Amish, as are 97% of Indiana's, and 63% of Pennsylvania's. In Lancaster County, Pennsylvania, there are roughly 300 licensed breeders, and an estimated further 600 unlicensed breeding facilities.

Reports of poor standards of care and treatment of dogs as a cash crop by members of the Amish community has led to calls for puppy mills and auctions to be closed, with one breeder being issued with a restraining order from the practice for numerous violations of the federal Animal Welfare Act. At the time the restraining order was issued, the breeder had at least 1000 dogs in their care.

Similar groups
Anabaptist groups that sprang from the same late 19th century Old Order Movement as the Amish share their Pennsylvania German heritage and often still retain similar features in dress. These Old Order groups include different subgroups of Old Order Mennonites, traditional Schwarzenau Brethren and Old Order River Brethren. The Noah Hoover Old Order Mennonites are so similar in outward aspects to the Old Order Amish, including dress, beards, horse and buggy, extreme restrictions on modern technology, Pennsylvania German language, that they are often perceived as Amish and even called Amish.

Conservative "Russian" Mennonites and Hutterites who also dress plain and speak German dialects emigrated from other European regions at different times with different German dialects, separate cultures, and related but different religious traditions. Particularly, the Hutterites live communally and are generally accepting of modern technology.

In Ukraine there is a nameless movement of Baptists that has been compared to the Amish, due to their similar beliefs of plain living and pacifism.

The few remaining Plain Quakers are similar in manner and lifestyle, including their attitudes toward war, but are unrelated to the Amish. Early Quakers were influenced, to some degree, by the Anabaptists, and in turn influenced the Amish in colonial Pennsylvania. Almost all modern Quakers have since abandoned their traditional dress.

Relations with Native Americans
The Northkill Amish Settlement, established in 1740 in Berks County, Pennsylvania, was the first identifiable Amish community in the new world. During the French and Indian War, the Hochstetler Massacre occurred: Local tribes attacked the Jacob Hochstetler homestead in the Northkill settlement on September 19, 1757. The sons of the family took their weapons but father Jacob did not allow them to shoot due to the Anabaptist doctrine of nonresistance. Jacob Sr.'s wife, Anna (Lorentz) Hochstetler, a daughter (name unknown) and Jacob Jr. were killed by the Native Americans. Jacob Sr. and sons Joseph and Christian were taken captive. Jacob escaped after about eight months, but the boys were held for several years. When freed, both of these sons joined the church and one of them became a minister.

As early as 1809 Amish were farming side by side with Native American farmers in Pennsylvania. According to Cones Kupwah Snowflower, a Shawnee genealogist, the Amish and Quakers were known to incorporate Native Americans into their families to protect them from ill-treatment, especially after the Removal Act of 1832.

The Amish, as pacifists, did not engage in warfare with Native Americans, nor displace them directly, but were among the European immigrants whose arrival resulted in their displacement.

In 2012, the Lancaster Mennonite Historical Society collaborated with the Native American community to construct a replica Iroquois Longhouse.

See also

 Amish & Mennonite Heritage Center
 Amish furniture
 Amish music
 Barn raising
 Bank of Bird-in-Hand
 Christian views on poverty and wealth
 Fancy Dutch
 Hutterites
 List of Amish and their descendants
 Martyrs Mirror Mennonites
 Neo-Luddism
 Shaker
 Pinecraft
 Plain people
 West Nickel Mines School shooting

Notes

References

Bibliography
 
 .
 Kraybill, Donald B., Karen M. Johnson-Weiner, and Steven M. Nolt, The Amish (Johns Hopkins University Press, 2013), 500 pp.
 .
 .
 .
 .
 .
 Mackall, Joe: Plain Secrets: An Outsider among the Amish, Boston, Mass. 2007.
 .
 .

Further reading

 Die Botschaft – Lancaster, PA – Newspaper for Old Order Amish and Old Order Mennonites; only Amish may place advertisements.
 The Budget  – Sugarcreek, OH – Weekly newspaper by and for Amish.
 The Diary – Gordonville, PA – Monthly newsmagazine by and for Old Order Amish.
 Beachy, Leroy (2011). Unser Leit ... The Story of the Amish. Millersburg, OH: Goodly Heritage Books. 
 DeWalt, Mark W. (2006). Amish Education in the United States and Canada. Rowman and Littlefield Education.
 Garret, Ottie A and Ruth Irene Garret (1998). True Stories of the X-Amish: Banned, Excommunicated and Shunned, Horse Cave, KY: Neu Leben.
 Garret, Ruth Irene (1998). Crossing Over: One Woman's Escape from Amish Life, Thomas More.
 Gehman Richard. "Plainest of Pennsylvania's Plain People Amish Folk". National Geographic, August 1965, pp. 226–53.
 Good, Merle and Phyllis (1979). 20 Most Asked Questions about the Amish and Mennonites. Intercourse, PA: Good Books.
 Hostetler, John A. ed. (1989). Amish Roots: A Treasury of History, Wisdom, and Lore. Baltimore: Johns Hopkins University Press.
 Igou, Brad (1999). The Amish in Their Own Words: Amish Writings from 25 Years of Family Life, Scottdale, PA: Herald Press.
 Johnson-Weiner, Karen M. (2006). Train Up a Child: Old Order Amish and Mennonite Schools. Baltimore: Johns Hopkins University Press.
 Johnson-Weiner, Karen M. (2017) New York Amish : Life in the Plain Communities of the Empire State (Cornell UP, 2017).
 Keim, Albert (1976). Compulsory Education and the Amish: The Right Not to be Modern. Beacon Press.
 Kraybill, Donald B. "Amish." in Gale Encyclopedia of Multicultural America, edited by Thomas Riggs, (3rd ed., vol. 1, Gale, 2014), pp. 97–112. online 
 Kraybill, Donald B. (2008). The Amish of Lancaster County. Mechanicsburg, PA: Stackpole Books.* Kraybill, Donald B. ed. (2003). The Amish and the State. Foreword by Martin E. Marty. 2nd ed.: Baltimore: Johns Hopkins University Press.
 Kraybill, Donald B. (2014). Renegade Amish: Beard Cutting, Hate Crimes, and the Trial of the Bergholz Barbers. Baltimore: Johns Hopkins University Press.
 Kraybill, Donald B. & Carl D. Bowman (2002). On the Backroad to Heaven: Old Order Hutterites, Mennonites, Amish, and Brethren. Baltimore: Johns Hopkins University Press.
 Kraybill, Donald B. & Steven M. Nolt (2004). Amish Enterprise: From Plows to Profits. 2nd ed. Baltimore: Johns Hopkins University Press.
 Kraybill, Donald B., Steven M. Nolt & David L. Weaver-Zercher (2006). Amish Grace: How Forgiveness Transcended Tragedy. New York: Jossey-Bass.
 Kraybill, Donald B., Steven M. Nolt & David L. Weaver-Zercher (2010). The Amish Way: Patient Faith in a Perilous World. New York: Jossey-Bass.
 Luthy, David (1991). Amish Settlements That Failed, 1840–1960. LaGrange, IN: Pathway Publishers.
 Nolt, Steven M. and Thomas J. Myers (2007). Plain Diversity: Amish Cultures and Identities. Baltimore: Johns Hopkins University Press.
 Schachtman, Tom (2006). Rumspringa: To be or not to be Amish. New York: North Point Press.
 Schlabach, Theron F. (1988). Peace, Faith, Nation: Mennonites and Amish in Nineteenth-Century America. Scottdale, PA: Herald Press.
 Schmidt, Kimberly D., Diane Zimmerman Umble, & Steven D. Reschly, eds. (2002) Strangers at Home: Amish and Mennonite Women in History. Baltimore: Johns Hopkins University Press.
 Scott, Stephen (1988). The Amish Wedding and Other Special Occasions of the Old Order Communities. Intercourse, PA: Good Books.
 Smith, Jeff (2016). Becoming Amish. Cedar, MI: Dance Hall Press
 Stevick, Richard A. (2007). Growing Up Amish: the Teenage Years. Baltimore: Johns Hopkins University Press.
 Umble, Diane Zimmerman (2000). Holding the Line: the Telephone in Old Order Mennonite and Amish Life. Johns Hopkins University Press.
 Umble, Diane Zimmerman & David L. Weaver-Zercher, eds. (2008). The Amish and the Media. Johns Hopkins University Press
 Weaver-Zercher, David L. (2001). The Amish in the American Imagination. Baltimore: Johns Hopkins University Press.
 Yoder, Harvey (2007). The Happening: Nickel Mines School Tragedy. Berlin, OH: TGS International.

External links

 "Amish" in the Global Anabaptist Mennonite Encyclopedia Online
 "FAQs About the Amish", by resident experts at the Mennonite Information Center.The Journal of Amish and Plain Anabaptist Studies''
"Amish Studies" at the Amish & Plain Anabaptist Studies Association, a professional organization of scholars and service providers to the Amish and plain people
 "Amish Studies" at Young Center for Anabaptist & Pietist Studies at Elizabethtown College
 Mennonite Historical Library at Goshen College
 "The Amish"  from the Missouri Folklore Society
 "Amish in Serbia – reportage" Amish in Serbia

 
Anabaptists
Christian organizations established in the 17th century
History of Lancaster, Pennsylvania
German-American culture
German-American history
German diaspora
Ohio culture
Peace churches
Pennsylvania culture
Protestantism in Indiana
Protestantism in Ohio
Anabaptism in Pennsylvania
Protestantism in Wisconsin
Religion in Lancaster, Pennsylvania
Religious organizations established in 1693
Simple living
Swiss-American culture
Ethnoreligious groups
1693 establishments in Europe
17th-century establishments in Switzerland
European diaspora in North America